The Texas A&M–Texas Tech football rivalry is an American college football rivalry between the Texas A&M Aggies football team of Texas A&M University and Texas Tech Red Raiders football team of Texas Tech University. The series began in 1927. The rivalry had continued uninterrupted since 1957 when the two schools became conference rivals. Texas A&M leads the series 37–32–1. Texas A&M started the series with a 12–3 advantage while the two teams played each other as non-conference opponents from 1927–1955. Texas Tech led with a 2–1 record during its probationary membership in the Southwest Conference from 1957–59. Texas A&M led the series during the Southwest Conference years (1960–95) with an 18–17–1 record. Texas Tech led the series during the Big 12 Conference years (1996–2011) with a 10–6 record. In summary, Texas A&M dominated the series during the early years (1927-1955) with a 12-3 advantage, while Texas Tech leads the series in the modern era (1957-2011) with a 29-25-1 advantage. Both teams are tied with six games each for the longest winning streak. Texas Tech holds the longest uninterrupted winning streak of the series, six games between 1968 and 1973, while Texas A&M has the longest nonconsecutive winning streak, six games in 1927, 1932 and 1942 through 1945. Texas A&M currently holds a three-game winning streak but with their departure from the Big 12 Conference in 2012, it is uncertain if the rivalry will continue in the future.

Venues
When both Texas A&M and Texas Tech were members of the Southwest Conference (SWC) from 1960 to 1995, and the Big 12 Conference from 1996 to 2011, the match-up was exclusively a home-and-home series in College Station and Lubbock. In all, 29 games were played in Lubbock and 28 in College Station. Both teams held a 3-game home field advantage as the Red Raiders record was 16–13 in Lubbock while the Aggies record in College Station was 15–12–1.

Prior to Texas Tech joining the SWC for football in 1960, 13 games of the rivalry were held at a neutral site in Amarillo, Dallas, and San Antonio. Only one game was held in Amarillo, a 7–0 Texas A&M victory in 1932. From 1943–50, the series was held at second neutral site, Alamo Stadium in San Antonio. Texas A&M held a 6–2 record over Texas Tech at Alamo Stadium. The 1951, 1955, 1958, and 1959 games were held at the Cotton Bowl in Dallas and the series at Fair Park was split 2–2. In the early 2000s, an effort was made to move the series back to the Cotton Bowl during the State Fair of Texas but ultimately the rivalry game remained a home-and-home series.

Will Rogers & Soapsuds statue

One of the most well-known landmarks on the campus of Texas Tech University is the statue of Will Rogers on his horse Soapsuds: Riding Into the Sunset. A campus legend holds that the statue was originally intended to be positioned with Will Rogers facing due west, so that it would appear he was riding into the sunset. However, that position would cause Soapsuds' posterior to face due east, towards downtown Lubbock, Texas, potentially insulting the Lubbock business community. To address this issue, the statue was turned 23 degrees to the east, causing Soapsuds' rear to face in the direction of the campus of Texas A&M University in College Station, Texas.

The campus legend led to Riding Into the Sunset becoming involved in the rivalry off the field. In 1969, the statue was vandalized after being covered in maroon paint, Texas A&M's primary color, after the Aggies lost to the Red Raiders 13–9. Following the vandalism in 1969, the Saddle Tramps, a Texas Tech student organization, wrap the statue in red crepe paper prior to every home football game.

Other Incidents
 After the 1962 Game, a hoard of Aggies approached within 20 yards of the Masked rider before a single A&M captain stood between them, calling off the attack.
 Unknown people, believed to be Texas A&M fans, kidnapped and vandalized the Masked Rider's Horse, Tech Beauty, the Friday night before their Saturday evening match-up Oct. 5, 1963. The horse was found on Sunday. Tech Beauty had been haphazardly shaved and had the letters 'AMC' (referring to A&M College) painted in white or silver paint on each side.
 After upsetting the #5 Aggies 21–19 in 1999, Texas Tech fans tore down and carried a goal post from Jones Stadium to the base of the Will Rogers statue, they then continued south to 19th street where they took it west before finally leaving it just west of the intersection of Flint Ave and 19th street. 
 In 2001 after defeating #24 A&M 12-0, Texas Tech fans similarly tore down the goal posts and attempted to carry them out of the stadium in the same area where they had been carried out in 1999. During the incident Mike McKinney, the father of an A&M football player and Texas Gov. Rick Perry's chief of staff at the time, was punched in the face. While at first believed to be a Tech fan, it turned out to be another A&M fan. Mike McKinney would later become the Chancellor of the Texas A&M System. 
 After the 2011 Game, a war of comments between both coaching staff started after it was insinuated that Texas A&M was faking injuries during the game to slow the pace of Texas Tech's Offense 
 Unrelated to football, but another symptom of rivalry, Texas A&M lobbyists attempted to block Texas Tech from building a Veterinary College in Amarillo. Texas Tech opened the college in 2021.

Game results

See also  
 List of NCAA college football rivalry games

Notes

References

College football rivalries in the United States
Texas A&M Aggies football
Texas Tech Red Raiders football
1927 establishments in Texas